Glyde is an unincorporated community in Washington County, Pennsylvania, United States.  It is home to the Dager-Wonsettler Farmstead.

Unincorporated communities in Washington County, Pennsylvania
Unincorporated communities in Pennsylvania